The Julian Smith Casino in Augusta, Georgia is not a gambling establishment as persons outside the CSRA might think from its name.  The casino part of its name is in the older sense of a place of recreation, not just a place of gambling.  It is named after Julian Smith, a former mayor of Augusta.  It is located at Lake Olmstead Park and can handle a banquet function for 300.

References
 
 

Buildings and structures in Augusta, Georgia
Tourist attractions in Augusta, Georgia